Sarginae is a subfamily of soldier flies in the family Stratiomyidae. There are at least 20 genera and 490 described species in Sarginae.

Genera
These 23 genera belong to the subfamily Sarginae:

 Acrochaeta Wiedemann, 1830
 Cephalochrysa Kertész, 1912
 Chloromyia Duncan, 1837
 Chrysochromioides Brunetti, 1926
 Filiptschenkia Pleske, 1926
 Formosargus James, 1939
 Gongrosargus Lindner, 1959
 Himantigera James, 1982
 Lobisquama James, 1982
 Merosargus Loew, 1855
 Microchrysa Loew, 1855
 Microptecticus Lindner, 1936
 Microsargus Lindner, 1958
 Otochrysa Lindner, 1938
 Paraptecticus Grünberg, 1915
 Ptecticus  Loew, 1855
 Ptectisargus Lindner, 1968
 Sagaricera Grünberg, 1915
 Sargus  Fabricius, 1798
 Stackelbergia Pleske, 1930

References

Stratiomyidae
Diptera of Europe
Diptera of Asia
Diptera of Africa
Taxa named by Francis Walker (entomologist)